WVIA-TV (channel 44) is a PBS member television station licensed to Scranton, Pennsylvania, United States, serving Northeastern Pennsylvania. Owned by the Northeast Pennsylvania Educational Television Association, it is sister to NPR member WVIA-FM (89.9). Both stations share studios in Jenkins Township (which shares a post office with Pittston). Through a channel sharing agreement with ABC affiliate WNEP-TV (channel 16), the two stations transmit using WNEP-TV's spectrum from an antenna at Penobscot Knob near Mountain Top.

History
In 1963, several men first met at Coughlin High School in Wilkes-Barre to discuss bringing an educational television station to northeastern Pennsylvania. Twelve of the men formed the Northeast Pennsylvania Educational Television Association, chaired by Wilkes-Barre superintendent of schools Walter Wood. They received a license for channel 44 a year later.

The station's first employee, general manager George Strimel, Jr., was hired in 1965 and given two years to get the station on the air. He was able to do so within nine months, and WVIA-TV signed on for the first time on September 26, 1966. The fledgling station received a considerable assist from the area's commercial stations. WNEP-TV donated the old transmitter and tower facility from WARM-TV (one of the two stations that merged to form WNEP 10 years earlier), while WBRE-TV (channel 28) and WDAU-TV (channel 22, now WYOU) made their studios available for local productions. All production work was done from the transmitter site.

The station grew rapidly, and within a year moved its offices from First Presbyterian Church in Wilkes-Barre to office space donated by King's College, and later to a school in Scranton. In 1969, WVIA moved to a specially-built studio at Marywood College in Scranton. In 1971, WVIA moved to its current studio in Jenkins Township.

The station didn't take long to become a part of the community; it won the Corporation for Public Broadcasting's award for community involvement for two straight years in the 1970s. It was the only public television station in Pennsylvania to stay on the air during a 1970 budget crisis. When Hurricane Agnes struck the area in 1972, WVIA preempted its programming to air weather reports around the clock, and lent its equipment to WBRE so it could stay on the air.

In 1978, WVIA activated its current tower on Penobscot Knob. It increased the station's coverage by 20%, enabling it to reach 20 counties and giving it a coverage area comparable with most of the area's commercial stations. The station also operates the largest translator network in Pennsylvania.

For many years, WVIA was available on cable systems beyond the Scranton–Wilkes-Barre TV market (including Cablevision in Fairfield County, Connecticut and Nassau County, New York). In part, this was due to its unorthodox programming—in the 1980s, it carried on Saturday and Sunday mornings sitcom reruns such as Leave it to Beaver, and The Dick Van Dyke Show and The Honeymooners on weekday afternoons, and on Saturday nights ran science-fiction series such as Star Trek which ran on WVIA from 1984 to 1994, The Twilight Zone, The Outer Limits, Doctor Who, plus Lost in Space on Saturday mornings. Later, the station aired The Waltons at 4:30 and 5 p.m. and All in the Family at 6 p.m. from 1989 to 1991. From 1991 until 2009, WVIA aired Little House on the Prairie from 5 p.m. to 6 p.m. All shows were given the usual PBS elements: airing commercial-free with underwriting announcements added before and after each show.

On December 16, 2007, the top section of WVIA's tower collapsed due to severe ice, wind, and snow. The felled top section of the tower supported the antennas for the analog TV signal on channel 44 and the digital TV signal on channel 41. WVIA-FM's antenna survived since it was located on the portion of the tower which did not collapse. After the incident, WVIA quickly put the analog TV signal back on the air through the use of a shorter back-up tower and antenna also located on Penobscot Knob. However, due to the shorter height, the service area has been limited.

Earlier that same day, the neighboring tower supporting the antennas for analog WNEP-TV and WCLH (90.7 FM) collapsed completely due to the ice and winds. The tower collapse also destroyed the transmitter building but no one was hurt in either incidents.

In 2009, the end of the Pennsylvania Public Television Network saw the Commonwealth cut WVIA's funding by $970,000, which forced the station to end production of several local programs.

WVIA-TV shut down its analog signal, over UHF channel 44, on February 17, 2009, the original target date in which full-power television stations in the United States were to transition from analog to digital broadcasts under federal mandate (which was later pushed back to June 12, 2009). The station's digital signal remained on its pre-transition UHF channel 41. Through the use of PSIP, digital television receivers display the station's virtual channel as its former UHF analog channel 44.

WVIA suffered another disruption to its signal on February 12, 2010, when the building housing the transmitters for WVIA-TV and WVIA-FM was destroyed by fire. Though the tower was not affected, the loss of the transmitters forced the stations off the air. The station quickly worked to restore programming to cable systems. The station was returned to the air as of February 15, 2010 courtesy of the help of WNEP-TV, using the ABC affiliate's transitional digital channel 49 transmitter and tower (the station moved to digital channel 50 post-transition in December 2009 to reduce interference with Philadelphia/Atlantic City Telemundo affiliate WWSI, but had not disassembled the former channel 49 facilities) to transmit all of their services. As with WVIA's digital channel 41, all channels will remap via PSIP to Channel 44.

In August 2011, thieves stole  of copper transmission line from WVIA's tower while WVIA was still temporarily using WNEP-TV's old tower, delaying a return to channel 41 and their own tower.  WVIA resumed use of their channel 41 transmitter and tower in March 2012.

The station sold its spectrum in FCC's broadcast auction ending February 10, 2017 for $25.9 million. The proceed was placed in its endowment. In conjunction with the auction result, the station announced a channel sharing agreement with WNEP, to stay on its virtual channel 44.

Programming
WVIA-TV produces shows such as Call the Doctor and Homegrown Concerts, as well as shows that focus on Pennsylvania and Northeast Pennsylvania, such as The Office: An American Workplace.

WVIA has historically aired children's programs during the day, and for many years, when it was an hour-long program, aired Sesame Street three times on weekdays—the previous weekday's episode in the morning, and the current day's episode at noon and at various times in late afternoon.

With the advent of the PBS Kids subchannel, WVIA has scaled back its children's programming on weekdays from 6 a.m. to 2 p.m. on its main channel.

Technical information

Subchannels 
The station's digital signal is multiplexed:

Translators

WVIA serves one of the largest coverage areas east of the Mississippi River. This area is very mountainous meaning that some areas cannot get a clear signal from the main transmitter.

References

External links
 Official website

PBS member stations
Television channels and stations established in 1966
1966 establishments in Pennsylvania
VIA-TV
Low-power television stations in the United States